The 2007 Royal Rumble was the 20th annual Royal Rumble professional wrestling pay-per-view (PPV) event produced by World Wrestling Entertainment (WWE). It was held for wrestlers from the promotion's Raw, SmackDown!, and ECW brand divisions. The event took place on January 28, 2007, at the AT&T Center in San Antonio, Texas. This marked the first time that the ECW brand participated at the Royal Rumble, which became WWE's third brand in mid-2006. As has been customary since 1993, the Royal Rumble match winner received a world championship match at that year's WrestleMania. For the 2007 event, the winner received their choice to challenge for either Raw's WWE Championship, SmackDown!'s World Heavyweight Championship, or the ECW World Championship at WrestleMania 23, marking the first time that three titles were an option.

Five professional wrestling matches were featured on the event's supercard, a scheduling of more than one main event. The main event was the 2007 Royal Rumble match, which featured wrestlers from all three brands. SmackDown!'s The Undertaker, the thirtieth entrant, won the match by last eliminating Raw's Shawn Michaels, the twenty-third entrant. The primary match on the Raw brand was a Last Man Standing match for the WWE Championship between John Cena and Umaga. Cena won the match and retained the title after Umaga was unable to get to his feet before the referee counted to ten. The predominant match on the SmackDown! brand was Batista versus Mr. Kennedy for the World Heavyweight Championship, which Batista won by pinfall after executing a Batista Bomb. The featured match on the ECW brand was between Bobby Lashley and Test for the ECW World Championship, which Lashley won after Test was counted out.

Production

Background
The Royal Rumble is an annual gimmick pay-per-view (PPV), produced every January by World Wrestling Entertainment (WWE) since 1988. It is one of the promotion's original four pay-per-views, along with WrestleMania, SummerSlam, and Survivor Series, dubbed the "Big Four". It is named after the Royal Rumble match, a modified battle royal in which the participants enter at timed intervals instead of all beginning in the ring at the same time. The 2007 event was the 20th event in the Royal Rumble chronology and was scheduled to be held on January 28, 2007, at the AT&T Center in San Antonio, Texas. It featured wrestlers from the Raw, SmackDown!, and ECW brands, which was the first Royal Rumble to include ECW, a relaunch of the former Extreme Championship Wrestling promotion that became WWE's third brand in May 2006.

The Royal Rumble match generally features 30 wrestlers and the winner traditionally earns a world championship match at that year's WrestleMania. For 2007, the winner could choose to challenge for either Raw's WWE Championship, SmackDown!'s World Heavyweight Championship, or the ECW World Championship at WrestleMania 23. This marked the first time that the ECW World Championship was a choice for the winner of the match, subsequently marking the first time that the winner had a choice between three world championships.

Storylines 
The card consisted of six matches, as well as one dark match. The matches resulted from scripted storylines, where wrestlers portrayed heroes, villains, or less distinguishable characters to build tension and culminated in a wrestling match or series of matches. Results were predetermined by WWE's writers on the Raw, SmackDown, and ECW brands, with storylines produced on their weekly television shows, Raw, SmackDown, and ECW.

The main feud heading into the Royal Rumble on Raw was between WWE Champion John Cena and Umaga. At the previous pay-per-view event, New Year's Revolution, Cena defeated Umaga to end his undefeated streak and retain the WWE Championship. The night after on Raw, Armando Alejandro Estrada, Umaga's manager, asked for a rematch, which Cena agreed to. Later that night, during a match between Cena and The Great Khali, Umaga interfered and attacked Cena. The following week, the official contract signing for their rematch at the Royal Rumble took place. After it was announced that Estrada could choose the match type, Estrada chose the match to be a Last Man Standing match. Cena signed the contract and proceeded to attack both Umaga and Estrada. On the January 22 episode of Raw, after Cena was eliminated from a Battle Royal, Umaga attacked Cena, and injured his spleen, which was portrayed as real as part of their storyline.

The predominant feud on the SmackDown! brand was between Batista and Mr. Kennedy, with the two battling over the World Heavyweight Championship. On the January 5 episode of SmackDown! a Beat the Clock Sprint began. Wrestlers competed in single matches, and the wrestler to win a match in the shortest amount of time would then become the number one contender to the World Heavyweight Championship at the Royal Rumble. Mr. Kennedy, who defeated Chris Benoit in nearly five minutes, had the shortest time at the end of the show. The following week, the Sprint continued. In the final match, between The Undertaker and The Miz, Kennedy interfered by pulling The Miz out of the ring. After performing the Tombstone piledriver on The Miz, The Undertaker went for the pin attempt. Time, however, ran out and Kennedy became the winner of the Sprint. The following week after on SmackDown!, The Undertaker was put in a match with Kennedy, where if he won, he would be added to the title match at the Royal Rumble. During the match, after Kennedy attacked Batista, who was at ringside. Batista retaliated against Kennedy, causing The Undertaker to get disqualified. Thus, the match at the Royal Rumble remained a singles match between Batista and Kennedy.

The main feud on the ECW brand was between Bobby Lashley and Test, with the two feuding over the ECW Championship. Rob Van Dam won an online poll against Test and Sabu to earn a title shot on the January 2 episode of ECW, which ended in no-contest. Van Dam was given another title match the next week. Test interfered in the match, and attacked both men. A Triple Threat match for the title occurred on the January 16 episode of ECW between Lashley, Van Dam, and Test. Lashley won, but was beaten down afterwards by Test. A title match between Lashley and Test was then made for the Royal Rumble. A week after that match was made, on the January 23 episode of ECW, Lashley defeated Test in another title match.

Event

Before the event went live on pay-per-view, JTG defeated Lance Cade in a dark match.

Preliminary match
The first match that aired was a tag team match between The Hardys (Matt and Jeff Hardy) and MNM (Joey Mercury and Johnny Nitro). The match went back and forth until MNM took control by attacking Matt's injured jaw repeatedly. The Hardys gained the advantage briefly, but lost it when Nitro countered an aerial attack by Jeff. Jeff finally tagged Matt, who beat down both Mercury and Nitro. The finish came when Matt delivered a Twist of Fate and Jeff performed the Swanton Bomb on Nitro. Jeff then pinned Nitro for the victory.

Main matches
The second match was Bobby Lashley against Test for the ECW World Championship. Test used many illegal moves, and took control after driving Lashley's shoulder into the ringpost. He continued to attack the shoulder until Lashley fought back with several powerful moves. Test rolled out of the ring, allowing himself to be counted out. Lashley won, and retained his title. He came after Test, however, brought him back into the ring, and continued to beat him down.

The third match was between World Heavyweight Champion Batista and Mr. Kennedy for the World Heavyweight Championship. Batista gained an early advantage by overpowering Kennedy until Kennedy injured Batista's knee by using the steel steps. Kennedy continued to attack Batista's knees, and applied various submission holds that target the knee. Batista fought back, still favoring the knee, until Kennedy pushed Batista into the referee and hit a low blow. Kennedy had Batista pinned for over a three-count, but the match went on due to the referee being knocked out. Kennedy brought the referee conscious but Batista performed a lariat and a Batista Bomb to retain the title.

In the fourth match, Umaga faced John Cena for the WWE Championship in the Last Man Standing match. Umaga dominated Cena, gaining the advantage by using powerful moves, and attacking Cena's bandaged ribs. Cena tried to fight back using the steel steps, but Umaga quickly recovered, and continued the beat down. Cena managed to hit a low blow and delivered a bulldog onto the steel steps, a spin-out powerbomb onto the steel steps, and the Five Knuckle Shuffle all onto Umaga. Umaga regained control when Cena attempted an FU onto the steps, and collapsed, hitting his head on the steps. Cena avoided a running headbutt drop, and hit Umaga in the head with a television monitor. Umaga stood but missed a running splash through a broadcast table. Umaga got up again as his manager, Armando Alejandro Estrada, detached one of the turnbuckles for Umaga to use. Cena avoided the attack, executed an FU, and applied the STF on Umaga using the loose ring rope. Umaga failed to answer the referee's count of ten, and Cena retained the title.

Main event match 

The final match was the Royal Rumble match. Kane, the tenth entrant, dominated the match upon entering, eliminating Tommy Dreamer and Sabu, by chokeslamming Sabu through a table Sabu had earlier set up. The Sandman, entering fifteen, used his signature Singapore Cane in the match before King Booker quickly eliminated him. Randy Orton and Edge worked together to eliminate the Hardys. After Booker was eliminated by Kane, he returned to the ring, eliminated Kane, and continued to beat him down. It took the combined effort of nine men to eliminate Viscera after Shawn Michaels performed a superkick on Viscera. The Great Khali, entering twenty-eighth, dominated upon entering the match, eliminating seven men quickly. The Great Khali tried to pose in front of the camera, but botched it by posing the wrong way. Shawn Michaels had to tell Khali which way to pose. The Undertaker entered last, who immediately fought with, and eliminated Khali, then Montel Vontavious Porter, leaving Edge, Orton, Michaels, and Undertaker as the final four. Orton executed an RKO on Michaels, causing him to roll out of the ring under the ropes and leaving Edge, Orton, and the Undertaker.  Orton caught Edge trying to attack him, but the two soon reconciled, working together on The Undertaker. Michaels, outside the ring, came back in, eliminating both Orton and Edge. The remaining two exchanged attacks until the end, when The Undertaker chokeslammed Michaels, who retaliated with Sweet Chin Music. Michaels attempted another Sweet Chin Music but Undertaker avoided it, then eliminated Michaels to win the match. The Undertaker became the first competitor to win the Rumble match from #30 (what is considered to be the "easiest" spot to win from, despite no one having done so in any previous match).

Reception
The AT&T Center has hosted many different events that have a variety of seating maximums. A basketball event, which has a smaller set-up than a wrestling event, can hold a maximum of 18,797 fans. Due to the Royal Rumble's production, the maximum standard was lowered and the event drew 13,500 fans and received 491,000 pay-per-view buys. WWE made $15.8 million from pay-per-view revenues in their first quarter (which included the Royal Rumble, No Way Out, and WrestleMania) versus $17.1 million in 2006 for the same events, a $1.3 million difference. The 2006 Royal Rumble also resulted in 548,000 pay-per-view buys, 57,000 more than the 2007 Royal Rumble. Canadian Online Explorer's professional wrestling sub website, Slam! Wrestling, rated the entire event 7.5 out of 10 points, due to the event not lasting its entire three hours and many mishaps that occurred during the Royal Rumble match, which they also rated a 7.5. The last man standing match between John Cena and Umaga was widely praised.  The Royal Rumble 2007 was released on DVD on February 27, 2007 and was distributed by WWE. The DVD debuted on Billboards Top DVD sales chart at #3 on March 24, 2007. The DVD remained on the chart for 13 consecutive weeks until June 16, 2007 when its final rank was at #10.

Aftermath
The shows following the Royal Rumble surrounded The Undertaker's choice of which champion to face at WrestleMania 23. The Undertaker appeared on all three brands, and stared down the champions. Finally, on the February 5 episode of Raw, The Undertaker chose to face Batista for the World Heavyweight Championship, and hit him with a chokeslam, starting their rivalry. The Undertaker won the title at WrestleMania, improving his WrestleMania record to 15-0, and their feud continued until the May 11 episode of SmackDown!, when The Undertaker lost the title to Edge, who cashed in the Money in the Bank, that he won from Mr. Kennedy, earlier that week on Raw.

After The Undertaker made his choice on February 5, Shawn Michaels, Edge, and Randy Orton all wanted to face Cena for his title at WrestleMania. A Triple Threat match was made between the three for the title shot, which Michaels won after pinning Orton. Cena successfully retained his title against Michaels at WrestleMania. They continued to feud over the title with the addition of Orton and Edge, but Cena remained champion. Soon after the Royal Rumble, Umaga and Bobby Lashley joined the feud between Mr. McMahon and Donald Trump in the "Battle of the Billionaires" as their representatives respectively for the Hair vs. Hair match at WrestleMania.

His Royal Rumble match marked the start of Mr. Kennedy's push to main-event status. He went on to face Bobby Lashley for the ECW World Championship at No Way Out, which he won via disqualification, thus failing to win the title. Kennedy won the Money in the Bank ladder match at WrestleMania, which gave him a world title shot at any time of his choosing for the year following. Kennedy sustained an injury at a house show, however, that would leave him sidelined for five to seven months, and was booked to lose his title shot to Edge on the May 7 episode of Raw. Later results showed the injury to be much less severe, but Kennedy had already lost his title shot. He returned to mid-card status for the remainder of the year.

This was the last Royal Rumble ever to be in 4:3 format until January 2008 when it went to high definition.

Results

Royal Rumble entrances and eliminations

 – Raw – SmackDown! – ECW – Winner'

 Glenn Jacobs (Kane) made his eleventh appearance in a Royal Rumble match, breaking his own and Solofa Fatu (Rikishi)'s record for most Royal Rumble appearances. It was also his ninth-consecutive appearance, also billed as a record for Kane.
 This Royal Rumble set a new record for the most wrestlers involved in an elimination, taking 9 men to throw Viscera over the top rope. This beat the previous record set in the 1994 Royal Rumble when it took 7 men to eliminate Viscera (then known as Mabel).
 The Undertaker was the first wrestler to win the Royal Rumble match at number 30.
 King Booker was eliminated, but came back in and eliminated Kane.

Other on-screen personnel

References

External links
Official website

2007 in Texas
2007
Events in San Antonio
Professional wrestling in San Antonio
2007 WWE pay-per-view events
January 2007 events in the United States